Make it Your Race was a Swiss television series produced by Abarth TV in which amateurs learned to drive racing cars. It also had an Italian version.

References

External links 
https://www.youtube.com/watch?v=Zr71loI64yw

Swiss television series